Davoud Daneshdoost (born August 6, 1985) is an Iranian footballer. He currently plays for Aboomoslem in the Azadegan League.

Club career
Daneshdoost has spent his entire career with F.C. Aboomoslem

Club career statistics

 Assist Goals

References

Iranian footballers
Association football midfielders
F.C. Aboomoslem players
Tractor S.C. players
1985 births
Living people
People from Kashmar